Oberallgäu is an electoral constituency (German: Wahlkreis) represented in the Bundestag. It elects one member via first-past-the-post voting. Under the current constituency numbering system, it is designated as constituency 256. It is located in southwestern Bavaria, comprising the city of Kempten and the districts of Lindau and Oberallgäu.

Oberallgäu was created for the inaugural 1949 federal election. Since 2021, it has been represented by Mechthilde Wittmann of the Christian Social Union (CSU).

Geography
Oberallgäu is located in southwestern Bavaria. As of the 2021 federal election, it comprises the independent city of Kempten and the districts of Lindau and Oberallgäu.

History
Oberallgäu was created in 1949, then known as Kempten. It acquired its current name in the 1976 election. In the 1949 election, it was Bavaria constituency 46 in the numbering system. In the 1953 through 1961 elections, it was number 241. In the 1965 through 1972 elections, it was number 243. In the 1976 through 1998 elections, it was number 242. In the 2002 and 2005 elections, it was number 257. Since the 2009 election, it has been number 256.

Originally, the constituency comprised the independent cities of Kempten and Lindau and the districts of Landkreis Kempten, Landkreis Lindau, and Sonthofen. In the 1965 through 1972 elections, it also contained the district of Füssen. It acquired its current borders in the 1976 election.

Members
Like most constituencies in rural Bavaria, it is an CSU safe seat, the party holding the seat continuously since its creation. It was first represented by Karl von Spreti from 1949 to 1957, followed by Georg Krug from 1957 to 1969 and Wolfgang Pohle from 1969 to 1972. Ignaz Kiechle was representative from 1972 to 1994. Gerd Müller was elected in 1994 and served until 2021. He was succeeded by Mechthilde Wittmann in 2021.

Election results

2021 election

2017 election

2013 election

2009 election

References

Federal electoral districts in Bavaria
1949 establishments in West Germany
Constituencies established in 1949
Kempten
Lindau (district)
Oberallgäu